Aegean Park Press was a publisher based in Walnut Creek, California, specializing in cryptology, military intelligence, contract bridge and Mayan languages. The company's books on cryptology were "mostly reprints of fairly advanced texts, "[i]ncluding at least 16 books by World War II cryptologists William F. Friedman, Lambros D. Callimahos, and Solomon Kullback. It published more than 50 books related to cryptology and a smaller number of books on other areas such as military intelligence." It did most of its business by direct mail.

It was founded in 1973 by Wayne Barker (1922-2001).   

One of the company's ostensible customers has reported that it "ceased to exist either in lat[e] 2011 or early 2012". Better Business Bureau reported it was out of business as of January 2014.

References

External links
Aegean Park Press website

Companies based in Contra Costa County, California
Book publishing companies based in the San Francisco Bay Area